Baek Joo-hee is a South Korean actress. She is known for her roles in drama such as My Name, Extrecurricular, Lawless Lawyer, Crazy Love and Today's Webtoon. She also appeared in movies Someone Behind You, Homme Fatale, Start-Up and Hostage: Missing Celebrity.

Filmography

Television series

Film

Awards and nominations

References

External Links 
 
 

1976 births
Living people
21st-century South Korean actresses
South Korean television actresses
South Korean film actresses